965 Angelica (prov. designation:  or ), is a large background asteroid from the outer regions of the asteroid belt, approximately  in diameter. It was discovered on 4 November 1921, by astronomer Johannes F. Hartmann at the La Plata Astronomical Observatory in Argentina. The dark X-type asteroid (Xc) with a low TJupiter has a rotation period of 26.8 hours and is likely spherical in shape. It was named after the discoverer's wife, Angelica Hartmann.

Orbit and classification 

Angelica is a non-family asteroid of the main belt's background population when applying the hierarchical clustering method to its proper orbital elements. It orbits the Sun in the outer asteroid belt at a distance of 2.3–4.0 AU once every 5 years and 7 months (2,049 days; semi-major axis of 3.16 AU). Its orbit has an eccentricity of 0.28 and an inclination of 21° with respect to the ecliptic. Due to this relatively high inclination and eccentricity, Angelica has a Jupiter Tisserand's parameter just barely above 3, which is commonly used as the threshold to distinguish between the populations of asteroids and Jupiter-family comets. The body's observation arc begins at Heidelberg Observatory in December 1927, or six years after its official discovery observation at the La Plata Astronomical Observatory.

Naming 

This minor planet was named after Angelica Hartmann, wife of German astronomer Johannes F. Hartmann, who discovered this asteroid. The  was mentioned in The Names of the Minor Planets by Paul Herget in 1955.

Physical characteristics 

In the Bus–Binzel SMASS classification, Angelica is a Xc subtype, that transitions from the X-types to the carbonaceous C-type asteroids.

Rotation period 

During five nights in December 2017, a rotational lightcurve of Angelica was obtained from photometric observations by Tom Polakis at the Command Module Observatory  in Tempe, Arizona. Lightcurve analysis gave a rotation period of  hours with a very low brightness variation of  magnitude, which is indicative of regular, spherical shape.

Another observation from January 2018, by Brigitte Montminy and Katherine McDonald at Minnetonka High School, and Russell Durkee at the Shed of Science Observatory  in Minnetonka, Minnesota, determined a concurring period of  hours with an amplitude of   magnitude. Federico Manzini at the Sozzago Astronomical Station  obtained the object's first lightcurve in December 2006, measuring a period of  hours and an amplitude  magnitude.

Diameter and albedo 

The Collaborative Asteroid Lightcurve Link derives an albedo of 0.0515 and a diameter of 53.39 km based on an absolute magnitude of 10.2.

References

External links 
 Lightcurve Database Query (LCDB), at www.minorplanet.info
 Dictionary of Minor Planet Names, Google books
 Asteroids and comets rotation curves, CdR – Geneva Observatory, Raoul Behrend
 Discovery Circumstances: Numbered Minor Planets (1)-(5000) – Minor Planet Center
 
 

000965
Discoveries by Johannes Franz Hartmann
Named minor planets
000965
19211104